Andrew Schuttinger (July 13, 1892 – March 5, 1971) was an American jockey, trainer and owner in the sport of thoroughbred horse racing. A highly successful jockey, Andy Schuttinger won numerous important races including the Travers Stakes, Jockey Club Gold Cup, and what would become the second leg of the U.S. Triple Crown series, the Preakness Stakes. Among the many top horses he rode was Man o' War, as well as two-time American Champion Filly, Milkmaid, the 1914 American Horse of the Year and a Hall of Fame inductee, Roamer, and another Horse of the Year in 1917, Old Rosebud,

Trainer career
Schuttinger announced his retirement from riding on July 20, 1926, advising that he would immediately embark on a career as a trainer with W. T. Anderson's stable based at Saratoga Race Course.  In September of the following year he took charge of the racing stable of James Butler, the prominent owner of Empire City Race Track.  He remained with Butler until December 24, 1930, and on March 28, 1931, he took over the racing stable of Willis Sharpe Kilmer. Among the horses Schuttinger trained for Kilmer was the U.S. Racing Hall of Fame colt, Sun Beau.  He later simultaneously trained horses for Cornelius Vanderbilt Whitney and Joseph M. Roebling.

Equally successful as a trainer as he had been as a jockey, Andy Schuttinger and his wife notably owned and raced horses he trained such as Pilate, Key Ring, Red Welt, Fortification, Fleetborough and probably their best runner, multiple stakes winner, Ferd. 

Andy Schuttinger began winding down his racing operations in 1952 and retired from the business. He died in 1971 in Florida at age seventy-eight.

References
  article on Man o' War and Andy Schuttinger winning the Travers stakes August 22, 1920 The New York Times
  article titled 6 Riders of Previous Winners Of Preakness Watch Classic May 11, 1929 The New York Times

External links

1892 births
1971 deaths
American horse trainers
American jockeys
American racehorse owners and breeders
Sportspeople from Brooklyn